Tour of Iran (Azerbaijan) 2017 was a UCI 2.1 Asian Tour stage race and the 32nd edition of Tour of Iran (Azerbaijan) which took place across six stages October 8–13, 2017 in Iranian Azerbaijan. The total length of the tour was 1,017.0 km with its route passing through Tabriz, Urmia, Jolfa, Sarein, and Sahand Ski Resort. A total of 14 Iranian and International teams participated in this edition of the tour.

Participant teams

Stages of the Tour

Final Standing

References

2017
2017 UCI Asia Tour